Fitzroy SC may refer to:

Fitzroy City SC, an Association football (soccer) club based in Richmond, Victoria, Australia
Fitzroy District FC, a defunct Association football (soccer) club based in Fitzroy, Victoria, Australia
Fitzroy SC (1966–1973), a defunct Association football (soccer) club based in Fitzroy, Victoria, Australia
Heidelberg United FC, formerly 'Fitzroy United Alexander FC', an Association football (soccer) club based in Heidelberg West, Victoria, Australia